The Shchara is a river in Belarus, and is the left tributary of the Neman. The Shchara is the 5th longest river in Belarus.

It flows through Slonim.

Main tributaries 
Right: Lipnyanka, Myshanka, Lakhazva, Isa, Padyavarka.

Left: Vedma, Grivda, Lukonitsa, Sipa.

References 

Rivers of Brest Region
Rivers of Grodno Region
Rivers of Belarus